Unstone railway station was a station in Derbyshire, England.

It was built by the Midland Railway in 1870 and was designed by the company architect John Holloway Sanders.

It was on what is known to railwaymen as the "New Road" to Sheffield. This bypassed the North Midland Railway's  original line, which had avoided Sheffield due to the gradients involved, and came to be known as the "Old Road".

Originally called Unston, until 1908 when the "e" was added. It had timber buildings without canopies. It closed to passengers in 1951 and for goods services in 1961.

From Unstone, the line continued the long 1 in 100 climb to Dronfield.

References

Disused railway stations in Derbyshire
History of Derbyshire
Railway stations in Great Britain opened in 1870
Railway stations in Great Britain closed in 1951
Former Midland Railway stations
John Holloway Sanders railway stations